Peter Hirsch (born 1928 in Plön, Schleswig-Holstein, Germany) is a microbiologist who received his doctorate from the University of Hamburg. After spending nine years in the US he was asked to found an Institute of General Microbiology at the university of Kiel, Germany. He has made many contributions to the study of microbiology. The genus Hirschia, a type of hyphal bacteria, is named after him.

References 

1928 births
Living people
German microbiologists